Helena Pickard (13 October 1900 – 27 September 1959) was a British stage, film and television actress.

Career

Pickard was a prominent character actress in West End plays such as When We Are Married and Flare Path and also appeared on Broadway. She made her screen debut in the 1924 silent film The Clicking of Cuthbert. She played the female lead in the 1931 comedy Splinters in the Navy but mostly appeared in supporting roles.
 
While working in the United States she appeared in two Hollywood productions before returning to Britain. During her later career she appeared occasionally on television in series including The Four Just Men, Dr Jekyll and Mr Hyde and Vanity Fair, and in the BBC radio series Saturday Night Theatre.

Personal life
Pickard was the sister of Group Captain Percy Charles Pickard, RAF, who died during the Second World War while leading the air raid on Amiens Prison in Operation Jericho on 18 February 1944. 

She was married to the celebrated actor Cedric Hardwicke, with whom she had a son, Edward Hardwicke, who also became an actor. Later, after divorcing Hardwicke, she married the financier Herbert Rothbarth. She died in 1959 from an accidental overdose of sleeping pills, with her remains handled at Golders Green Crematorium.

Filmography

References

Bibliography
 Rubinstein, William D. The Palgrave Dictionary of Anglo-Jewish History. Palgrave Macmillan, 2011.

External links

1900 births
1959 deaths
British television actresses
British stage actresses
British film actresses
Actresses from Sheffield
20th-century British actresses
20th-century English women
20th-century English people